Crassispira logani is an extinct species of sea snail, a marine gastropod mollusk in the family Pseudomelatomidae, the turrids and allies. Fossils have been found in Miocene strata in Kerala, India, age range: 23.03 to 15.97 Ma.

References

 A. K. Dey. 1961. The Miocene Mollusca from Quilon, Kerala (India). Palaeontologica Indica 36

External links
 Worldwide Mollusc Species Data Base: Crassispira logani

logani
Gastropods described in 1961